Fung Wo Estate is a public housing estate in Sha Tin, New Territories, Hong Kong near Wo Che Estate on the site of the former Sha Tin Police Married Quarters, which was demolished in 2007. The estate consists of three residential blocks completed in 2013.

Houses

Demographics
According to the 2016 by-census, Fung Wo Estate had a population of 3,547. The median age was 39.9 and the majority of residents (99.1 per cent) were of Chinese ethnicity. The average household size was 2.2 people. The median monthly household income of all households (i.e. including both economically active and inactive households) was HK$15,000.

Politics
Fung Wo Estate is located in Lek Yuen constituency of the Sha Tin District Council. It was formerly represented by Jimmy Sham Tsz-kit, who was elected in the 2019 elections until July 2021.

See also

Public housing estates in Sha Tin

References

Sha Tin
Residential buildings completed in 2013
Public housing estates in Hong Kong
2013 establishments in Hong Kong